The 2013 Tasmania Microsoft Office 365 was a motor race meeting for the Australian sedan-based V8 Supercars. It was the second event of the 2013 International V8 Supercars Championship. It was held on the weekend of 5–7 April at the Symmons Plains Raceway, near Launceston, Tasmania.

The race meeting was the first to feature the new for 2013 format of a half-time concept in a motor race. The first of the meeting's three races was halted after 25 of 50 laps for a break of approximately 20 minutes before regridding and restarting.

Report

Race 3

Race

Championship standings after the race
 After 5 of 36 races.

Drivers' Championship standings

Teams' Championship standings

 Note: Only the top five positions are included for both sets of standings.

References 

Tasmania
April 2013 sports events in Australia